Nanpei Memorial High School, also known as Kitti High School, is a senior high school in Kitti, Pohnpei Island, Pohnpei State, Federated States of Micronesia. , the school, operated by the Pohnpei State Department of Education, has about 600 students.

See also
 Education in the Federated States of Micronesia

References

Pohnpei
High schools in the Federated States of Micronesia